Dread may refer to:

Feelings 
 Angst (in existentialist thought), a deep-seated spiritual condition of insecurity and despair in the free human being
 Anxiety

People

Reggae musicians 
 Doctor Dread (born 1954), American music producer
 Judge Dread (1945–1998), British musician
 Massive Dread (c. 1960–1994), Jamaican deejay
 Mikey Dread (1954–2008), Jamaican singer
 Ranking Dread (c. 1955–1996), Jamaican deejay

Other
 Adam Dread (born 1963), American lawyer and politician
 Zebulon Dread, South African writer
 Emmanuel Wilmer aka "Dread Wilmer" (died 2005)

Arts, entertainment, and media

Fictional entities
 Dread & Alive, the award-winning black comic book series created by Nicholas Da Silva aka ZOOLOOK
 Brig of Dread (Bridge of Dread), the mythological bridge to Purgatory
 Judge Dread, the alternate universe Judge Dredd from Dread Dominion
 Lord Dread, a character in the TV series Captain Power and the Soldiers of the Future

Games
 Dread (role-playing game)
 Dread: The First Book of Pandemonium, a role-playing game
 Metroid Dread, a game in the Metroid franchise

Other arts, entertainment, and media
 Dread (album) recorded by Living Colour
 Dread (film) directed by Anthony DiBlasi
 "Dread", a short story in Clive Barker's Books of Blood series, or the comic book or stage adaptation of the same
 Dread Broadcasting Corporation, a London pirate radio station
 Dread (forum), a Reddit-like dark web discussion forum

Other uses 
 DREAD (risk assessment model)
Dread, a model of centrifugal gun
 Dreadlocks, a hairstyle also known as dreads

See also
 Anti Dread, Polish punk rock band
 Dred (disambiguation)
 Dredd (disambiguation)
 Receptor activated solely by a synthetic ligand, also known as DREADD
 Vandread, a science fiction anime